Prawda  is a village in the administrative district of Gmina Rzgów, within Łódź East County, Łódź Voivodeship, in central Poland.

Climate
Prawda has a humid continental climate (Cfb in the Köppen climate classification).

<div style="width:70%;">

References

 Central Statistical Office (GUS) Population: Size and Structure by Administrative Division - (2007-12-31) (in Polish)

Villages in Łódź East County